Grand Ayatollah  Syed Mohsin Nawab Rizvi (14 April 1911 – 26 August 1969) popularly known as Mohsin-ul-millat, was a poet, writer, speaker and a Twelver Shia Marja from India. He served as vice principal of Sultanul Madaris, Lucknow, and as a principal of Govt Oriental College Madarsa Alia, Rampur and Madarsa Imaniya Nasiriya, Jaunpur.

Biography

He was born in 1911 at Lucknow. His father Maulana Syed Ahmad Nawab Rizvi was a prominent Shia Scholar and was the editor of the monthly Urdu magazine, Alawarif. After earning his degree of Sadrul Afazil from Madrasa Sulatanul Madaris, he went to Hawza 'Ilmiyya Najaf, Iraq, where he studied Dars al-Kharij with Ayatollah Abu l-Hasan al-Isfahani, Ayatollah Syed Ziauddin Iraqi, Ayatollah Mirza Hussein Naini, Ayatollah Shaikh Abdul Husain Rashti, and Ayatollah Seyed Jawad Tabrezi, He earned the Ijazae ijtihad (the highest degree of islamic jurisprudence). 
Rizvi understood Urdu, Arabic and Farsi. During his student life in Lucknow he was the editor of an Arabic religious and literary magazine, Al-Adeeb, which was published under the patronage of Nasirul Millat Syed Nasir Husain. After returning from Iraq he was appointed as a principal of Jamaey Imaniya Nasirya, Jaunpur. He managed a middle school, which became a leading degree college in Jaunpur District, known as Raza D.M. Shia Degree College. After Jaunpur, Rizvi was called on by then Nawab of Rampur Raza Ali Khan Bahadur Rampur State (U.P) India to take charge of the Madrsa-e-Aliya (Oriential college) Rampur (UP) as principal. After remaining few years as the principal he came back to Lucknow and joined Madrase Sultanul Madaris Lucknow (U.P.) India as vice principal, as the Matla-e-Anwar (written by Maulana Murtaza Husain Sadrul-Afazil). He was chief patron of the monthly Urdu magazine ALILM. He wrote many books, some of them published and others still unpublished. He was a great khateeb (orator). He was the general secretary of All India Shia Majlise Ulama (Council of Scholars); among scholars he was known as Mohsinullmillat. 
He died on 26 August 1969 and is buried in Lucknow.

Notable disciples

 Maulana Syed Mazahir Husain Rizvi Ex- Leader of Friday Prayers, Sultanate of Mahmudabad, Awadh, Lucknow, India
 Maulana Syed Hamidul Hasan Ex- Principal Jamia Nazmia, Lucknow, India.
 Molvi Iftikhar Hussain Ansari Ex- MLA, President All Jammu & Kashmir Shia Association. Srinagar, India.
 Mirza Mohammed Athar, Ex Principal Shia college, Lucknow, India
 Dr.Syed Mohammad Waris Hasan Naqvi PhD (Edenbraugh University) Ex Principal Madrase Waizeen, Lucknow, India.
 Syed Ahmed (politician), Ex Governor Jharkhand and Manipur.
Dr. Syed Kalbe Sadiq Naqvi PhD (Muslim University Aligarh) Lucknow, India.
Dr. Syed Shabeehul Hasan Nunahravi, PhD, Ex Head of Department Urdu (Lucknow University Lucknow, UP, India
 Maulana Shaikh Shabbir Hasan Najafi Mujtahid Kopa Gang Dist Azam Gadh, UP, India Ex Teacher Hauza e Ilmiyah, Mashhad, Iran
Maulana Mirza Mohammad Alim Lucknow, UP India.

Writings
Ghadeer se Karbala tak
Hadees Madeenatul Ilm (Hadees ki Sanad aur uski dalalat)
Zaereen-e- Qaime Aley Mohammad (A.S)
Falsafa-e- Sahro Aijaz
Kahalike Kaiynat aur Qadeem wa Jadeed Falsafi
Altatheer
Mhuaabat Ahlebait-e- Tahireen (A.S) wa Gunahgar Momineen
Diwane Shaeri (Qasaed wa Gazalyat)
Hazrat Mola Imam Hussain A.s ka Matam

Books written in Arabic

References

1969 deaths
1911 births
Indian Shia Muslims
Scholars from Lucknow
Indian ayatollahs